Made in America is the second album released by Kam. It was released on March 14, 1995 for East West Records and was produced by DJ Battlecat, DJ Quik, E-A-Ski, Warren G and Cold 187um, among others. Made in America was a modest success, peaking at #158 on the Billboard 200, #20 on the Top R&B/Hip-Hop Albums and #8 on the Top Heatseekers. This was Kam's last album for East West Records.

Track listing

Charts

References

External links
 

Kam (rapper) albums
1995 albums
Albums produced by Battlecat (producer)
Albums produced by E-A-Ski
Albums produced by DJ Quik
Albums produced by Warren G
Elektra Records albums
G-funk albums
Political music albums by American artists